Dunbar Lifeboat Station is a lifeboat station located in Dunbar Harbour at Dunbar, on the south-east coast of Scotland, operated by the Royal National Lifeboat Institution. The station operates a Trent-class all-weather lifeboat and a D-class inshore lifeboat. Dunbar is one of the earlier British ports to be served by a lifeboat, the first station being constructed in 1808.

History 

Dunbar Harbour has been a fishing and trading port since at least 1574, and for a considerable period was classified as a port of refuge; it is located on the North Sea coast of south-west Scotland, venue for many thousands of shipwrecks over the centuries. In Britain, the history of lifeboats dates (two outliers excepted) to Henry Greathead's 1790 boat at South Shields on the River Tyne in England; in 1824 the Royal National Lifeboat Institution was founded to take a nationwide interest in the provision of lifeboats, but it was relatively ineffective in its earliest years. Lifeboat provision prior to about 1850 was a matter for local communities, with little institutional support.

Dunbar ranks amongst the earlier harbours to be equipped with a lifeboat, equipping itself with a boat of Henry Greathead's design and manufacture, together with a boat-carriage, boathouse and a Manby apparatus, in 1808. The initiative to establish a station at Dunbar came from George Miller, a native of the town, son of a merchant and established as a bookbinder and bookseller, but having had a long fascination with seafaring. By his own account, he had as a child conceived of mortar-launched lines as a means of reaching shoreline wrecks, many years in advance of George William Manby's successful implementation of the idea, and remained fascinated by shipwreck and rescue. Miller became acquainted with South Shields' lifeboat initiative, when he spent some days from 6 April 1789 undertaking work experience with a bookseller in the town. 1789 was a year in which the town was the 'epicentre of lifeboat innovation', arising out of the highly visible and protracted wrecking of a vessel, the Adventure, on the Herd Sands to the north-east of the South Shields on 14 March. The Newcastle-upon-Tyne Trinity House to hold a competition for the design of a lifeboat, which led to the adoption of Greathead's design.

Miller, with others, campaigned from as early as 1793 for the establishment at Dunbar of a lifesaving operation, suggesting both a mortar and line, and a lifeboat, but their aspirations came to nothing. It took until 1807, prompted by the death of a sailor on 6 September in a shoreline wreck at Thorntonlock, to the east of Dunbar, before Miller's ideas got traction. He floated a proposal for a lifeboat in the Edinburgh Evening Courant and quickly a committee of local worthies was formed, and as quickly, a subscription raised above £366, which by 1808 yielded lifeboat, station, carriage and minimal float for expenses. David Anderson's 2002 paper on The Dunbar Lifeboat notes five occasions on which it responded to mariners in distress, but notes that there are no good records of its employment.

Lack of competent management of the affairs of the lifeboat station brought the Dunbar service to an end sometime after 1818, when damage occasioned to the Greathead boat went unrepaired, and it was found to be unavailable to assist with an 1821 wrecking. From about 1830, Dunbar was served by a Rocket Brigade using Mandy apparatus. It was not until 1864 that the town petitioned to the reinvigorated RNLI for a replacement boat; by 1865 the Wallace had been supplied, and a new boathouse erected by the Victoria Harbour. The current boathouse dates from 1901, and was extended and refurbished in 1996.

Sir Ronald Pechell BT

Sir Ronald Pechell BT was a Trent class all weather lifeboat that operated at Dunbar from 1995 to 2008. During the Easter weekend of 2008 the lifeboat was damaged beyond economic repair after her moorings snapped during severe storms. The Sir Ronald Pechell Bt, valued at £208K in 2008, cost £1.05M to build in 1995 and in her 13 years of service at Dunbar had launched 206 times and rescued 171 people. The lifeboat, John Neville Taylor, from the charity's relief fleet has been allocated to the town permanently.

Fleet

All-weather lifeboats

Inshore lifeboats

Station honours
At Dunbar lifeboat station the following RNLI awards have been made:

Framed Letters of Thanks 5
Thanks of the Institution Inscribed on Vellum 2
Bronze Medal 1
Silver Medal 4

Notes

References

Sources

External links
 Website of Dunbar Lifeboat Station
 RNLI Station Guide - Dunbar

Lifeboat stations in Scotland
Dunbar